In Greek mythology, Ioke is the female personification of onslaught, battle-tumult, and pursuit. In the Iliad, she is one of the daimones, or spirits, of Zeus's aegis. The other daimones are Phobos, Eris, and Alke.

The ancient Greek word  is a rare doublet for  "rout, pursuit" from the common verb  "drive, pursue, chase away".

Notes

References 

 Homer, The Iliad with an English Translation by A.T. Murray, Ph.D. in two volumes. Cambridge, MA., Harvard University Press; London, William Heinemann, Ltd. 1924. . Online version at the Perseus Digital Library.
 Homer, Homeri Opera in five volumes. Oxford, Oxford University Press. 1920. . Greek text available at the Perseus Digital Library.

Greek war deities
War goddesses
Greek goddesses
Personifications in Greek mythology
Deities in the Iliad
Daimons